The conversion of mosques into non-Islamic places of worship has occurred for centuries. The most prominent examples of such took place after and during the Reconquista.

Conversion of mosques into churches 

This table lists former mosques with identified original buildings or ruins. It also includes those churches where the original structure of the mosque no longer survives and the church was built at the site of a former mosque.

Conversion of mosques into temples

This table lists former mosques with identified original buildings that have been converted into temples. It also includes those temples where the original structure of the mosque no longer survives and the temple was built at the site of a former mosque.

Conversion of mosques into gurdwaras 

This table lists former mosques with identified original buildings that have been converted into Sikh gurdwaras.

Conversion of mosques into synagogues 

This table lists former mosques with identified original buildings that have been converted into synagogues.

See also 
 Conversion of non-Islamic places of worship into mosques

References 

Islam and other religions
Mosque-related controversies
Former mosques
Mosques
Supersessionism